Russell County is a county located in the Commonwealth of Virginia. As of the 2020 census, the population was 25,781. Its county seat is Lebanon.

History

On January 2, 1786, Russell County was established from a section of Washington County. L.P. Summers, a Washington County historian later wrote, "Washington County lost a great extent of country and many valuable citizens when Russell County was formed." The county was named for Culpeper County native Colonel William Russell. 

The first court met in May 1786 in the Castle's Woods settlement (present-day Castlewood) in the house of William Robinson. Later, a new place was built to house the County Seat. The structure used as a courthouse still stands, and is referred to as "The Old Courthouse." The present Courthouse, located in Lebanon, has been in use since 1874. Once vast, Russell County was split several times, giving rise to Tazewell County, Lee County, Scott County, Wise County, Buchanan County and Dickenson County.

Among Russell County's most famous politicians were Daniel Boone, Governor H.C. Stuart, State Representative Boyd C. Fugate and State Senator Macon M. Long. The largest cattle farm East of the Mississippi River, and one of the oldest corporations in the country, Stuart Land & Cattle, remains headquartered at Rosedale in Russell County.

Much of the county's history has been documented Clinch Valley Times, the Tazewell Republican, the Abingdon Virginian, and the Lebanon News.

Geography

The county has the fourth highest peak in Virginia, Beartown Mountain.

Adjacent counties
 Dickenson County – northwest
 Buchanan County – north
 Tazewell County – east
 Smyth County – southeast
 Washington County – south
 Scott County – southwest
 Wise County – west

Major highways

Demographics

2020 census

Note: the US Census treats Hispanic/Latino as an ethnic category. This table excludes Latinos from the racial categories and assigns them to a separate category. Hispanics/Latinos can be of any race.

2010 Census
The 2010 census showed a population decline, with only 28,897 residing in Russell County. 

As of the census of 2000, there were 30,308 people, 11,789 households, and 8,818 families residing in the county.  The population density was 64 people per square mile (25/km2).  There were 13,191 housing units at an average density of 28 per square mile (11/km2).  The racial makeup of the county was 96.07% White, 3.08% Black or African American, 0.11% Native American, 0.05% Asian, 0.28% from other races, and 0.40% from two or more races.  0.78% of the population were Hispanic or Latino of any race.

There were 11,789 households, out of which 31.00% had children under the age of 18 living with them, 60.90% were married couples living together, 10.10% had a female householder with no husband present, and 25.20% were non-families. 23.10% of all households were made up of individuals, and 10.00% had someone living alone who was 65 years of age or older.  The average household size was 2.44 and the average family size was 2.87.

In the county, the population was spread out, with 21.20% under the age of 18, 8.60% from 18 to 24, 30.90% from 25 to 44, 26.00% from 45 to 64, and 13.30% who were 65 years of age or older.  The median age was 39 years. For every 100 females there were 102.70 males.  For every 100 females age 18 and over, there were 103.30 males.

The median income for a household in the county was $26,834, and the median income for a family was $31,491. Males had a median income of $26,950 versus $20,108 for females. The per capita income for the county was $14,863.  About 13.00% of families and 16.30% of the population were below the poverty line, including 21.30% of those under age 18 and 16.90% of those age 65 or over.

Education

Public high schools 
 Castlewood High School, Castlewood
 Honaker High School, Honaker
 Lebanon High School, Lebanon

Fire and rescue services
 Castlewood Fire and Rescue
 Lebanon Lifesaving Crew
 New Garden Rescue
 Lebanon Fire
 Honaker Fire
 Dante Rescue
 Dante Fire
 Copper Creek Fire
 Belfast Fire
 Saint Paul Fire
 Cleveland Volunteer Fire Department
 Cleveland Lifesaving Crew

Communities

Towns
 Cleveland
 Honaker
 Lebanon
 St. Paul (part)

Census-designated places
 Castlewood
 Dante (partially in Dickenson County)
 Raven (mostly in Tazewell County)

Other unincorporated communities
 Belfast
 Copper Creek
 Dickensonville
 Rosedale
 Swords Creek
 Willis

Politics

See also
 National Register of Historic Places listings in Russell County, Virginia

References

External links
 Russell County, Virginia's Official Website

 
1786 establishments in Virginia
Counties of Appalachia